Hörvikens IF is a Swedish football club located in Sölvesborg.

Background
Hörvikens IF currently plays in Division 4 Blekinge which is the sixth tier of Swedish football. They play their home matches at the Gröna Vallen in Sölvesborg.

The club is affiliated to Blekinge Fotbollförbund. Hörvikens IF have competed in the Svenska Cupen on 18 occasions.

Season to season

Footnotes

External links
 Hörvikens IF – Official website
 Hörvikens IF on Facebook

Football clubs in Blekinge County